Abu Jafar ibn Harun al-Turjali (died c. 1180) was born and raised in Trujillo to a noted Muwallad Muslim family. He received his education in Cordoba and later entered Almoravid service as a physician in Seville in Al-Andalus, he was a talented reader regarding the works of philosophy, he was thoroughly familiar with the Principles (usul) and the Branches (fura) of medical science, he was an excellent practitioner and his cures were frequently successful. He was the renowned educator of Ibn Bajjah and the young Ibn Rushd in his late years.

References

Philosophers from al-Andalus
Physicians from al-Andalus
12th-century people from al-Andalus
12th-century philosophers
12th-century physicians